Lapsa refers to Líneas Aéreas Platenses S.A., the name of a regional airline based in Montevideo, Uruguay.

History
LAPSA was formed as a state-owned company in 1962 with service to Buenos Aires, São Paulo and Rio de Janeiro. By 1965, its fleet consisted of two Convair CV-240 and three Lockheed L-188. By 1978, Lapsa began its jet era with the purchase of two Boeing 707. Within two years, Lapsa had flights to Miami, Frankfurt, and Madrid.

Due to its poor service, inefficient operations, outdated equipment and overemployment as a result of being a state-owned company, Lapas was losing $1.3 million a month. It was privatized in March 1995 after Andrés Rodríguez's government chose to privatize many state-owned corporations.

Destinations
Montevideo
Buenos Aires
Salto
Colonia
Punta del Este

Fleet
Later on, Lapsa's fleet consisted of three Embraer EMB 120 Brasilia.

See also
List of defunct airlines of Uruguay

References

Defunct airlines of Uruguay
Airlines established in 1962
Airlines disestablished in 1995
Economy of Montevideo
Companies based in Montevideo